William Stephen Muldrow (born June 15, 1964) is an American lawyer who serves as the United States Attorney for the United States District Court for the District of Puerto Rico. He was previously an Assistant United States Attorney for the Middle District of Florida.

Education 

Muldrow earned his Bachelor of Arts from Bucknell University, his Master of Arts from the American University School of International Service and his Juris Doctor, cum laude, from American University Washington College of Law.

Legal career 

Muldrow previously served as an Assistant United States Attorney in the District of Puerto Rico for six years. His prosecutorial career focused on drug trafficking offenses, money laundering, and violent crimes. He began his Department of Justice service as a Trial Attorney in the Tax Division.

Prior to becoming United States Attorney for Puerto Rico, he served as an Assistant United States Attorney in the Middle District of Florida, having previously served as the Office's Acting United States Attorney, First Assistant United States Attorney, and Chief of the Major Crimes Section.

U.S. Attorney 

On June 19, 2019, President Donald Trump announced his intent to nominate Muldrow to be the United States Attorney for the District of Puerto Rico. On June 24, 2019, his nomination was sent to the United States Senate. His nomination was favorably recommended for confirmation by the Senate Judiciary Committee, and he was confirmed by the full Senate on September 26, 2019. He was sworn into office on October 4, 2019.

On February 8, 2021, he along with 55 other Trump-era attorneys were asked to resign. On February 26, 2021, Muldrow announced that the White House asked him to continue as U.S. Attorney.

References

External links
Meet the U.S Attorney, justice.gov.

1964 births
Living people
Place of birth missing (living people)
American University School of International Service alumni
Assistant United States Attorneys
Bucknell University alumni
United States Attorneys for the District of Puerto Rico
United States Department of Justice lawyers
Washington College of Law alumni
20th-century American lawyers
21st-century American lawyers